The International Development (Reporting and Transparency) Act 2006 (c 31) is an Act of the Parliament of the United Kingdom.

Baroness Whitaker said that the purpose of the Act is to ensure that the promises made by the Government at the 31st G8 summit, and any future promises, are kept.

This Act is amended by articles 3 and 4 of the Treaty of Lisbon (Changes in Terminology) Order 2011 (S.I. 2011/1043)

References
Halsbury's Statutes,

External links
The International Development (Reporting and Transparency) Act 2006, as amended from the National Archives.
The International Development (Reporting and Transparency) Act 2006, as originally enacted from the National Archives.
Explanatory notes to the International Development (Reporting and Transparency) Act 2006.

United Kingdom Acts of Parliament 2006